Pieter Perquin (born 13 April 1982, Amsterdam, Netherlands), better known under the pseudonym Perquisite, is a Dutch musician, music producer and composer.

Biography 
In 1996, at the age of 14, Perquisite started making hip-hop beats. Due to his classical musical background he often incorporated classical and jazzy elements into his creations. In 2001 he started his own record label Unexpected Records and made his debut with the Outta Nowhere EP, in collaboration with Dutch jazz saxophonist Benjamin Herman. After this, he composed and produced another solo EP, Double Vision, which was released in 2002.

In 2003 Perquisite started collaborating with Dutch rapper/MC Pete Philly, and together they had their breakthrough as the hip-hop duo Pete Philly & Perquisite. They released two studio-albums, 'Mindstate' and 'Mystery Repeats' and toured around the world with their live band for five years straight. They played multiple festivals, including Lowlands, North Sea Jazz and Sziget. Their studio album 'Mindstate' (2005) received a lot of critical acclaim, Talib Kweli stating; 'Musically, these guys are light years ahead of the game.'. Studio album 'Mystery Repeats' (2007) came in second position in the Dutch album charts to stay there for 25 weeks. Together Pete & Perq won multiple prizes, including the Dutch 'Silver Harp', and the 'Amsterdam Prize for the Arts'. After more than 300 performances in and outside of the Netherlands, including providing the support act for James Brown and Kanye West, the duo ended their collaboration in the autumn of 2009 with a last 'Final Celebration Tour'.

In 2009 Perquisite won a Golden Calf, (which is the award of the Netherlands Film Festival) for composing the music for the film 'Carmen van het Noorden'. After this, Perquisite composed the music for several Dutch feature films, amongst them 'Hartenstraat' (2014), 'Brasserie Valentijn' (2016), 'Huisvrouwen Bestaan Niet' (2017) and 'Niemand In De Stad' (2018). For the latter he received another Gouden Kalf nomination.

Right after his first film music assignment, Perquisite started working on his solo album 'Across', that saw its release in October 2010. On 'Across' Perquisite collaborated with twelve different Dutch vocalists, among them Torre Florim (De Staat), Cato van Dijck (My Baby) and Janne Schra.

In 2012 Perquisite met singer Kris Berry at a weekly jam session in Amsterdam. They started writing songs together and decided to release an album. Joint effort 'Lovestruck Puzzles' was released in September 2013 via Unexpected Records.

Late 2015 Perquisite was invited to function as a judge for performances by students at the Conservatory in Enschede. There he first met Jeangu Macrooy, with whom a musical collaboration kicked off. Jeangu was signed to Unexpected Records and his debut EP 'Brave Enough', produced by Perquisite, was released in April 2016. The next year debut album 'High On You' was released, which was nominated for the Edison Pop in the category 'Best Album', followed by Jeangu's second album 'Horizon'. Both were produced and co-written by Perquisite. The Dutch entry for the Eurovision Song Contest 2020, Jeangu Macrooy's 'Grow', was also produced by Perquisite. The Eurovision Song Contest 2020 was cancelled due to Covid-19, but Jeangu Macrooy will be performing at the Eurovision Song Contest 2021 with the new song 'Birth Of A New Age', that was written and produced by Jeangu and Perquisite. Perquisite will also act as creative supervisor for Jeangu's performance in the finals on May 22, 2021 in Rotterdam.

Besides his career as an artist/producer/composer, Perquisite has been running his own record label Unexpected Records since 2001. He has also been responsible for the management of Pete Philly & Perquisite and Kris Berry & Perquisite and is currently managing Jeangu Macrooy. Also, he was a member of the board of Dutch copyright organisation BUMA/STEMRA from 2013 until 2018. In 2015 Perquisite and a number of other musicians (including Tjeerd Bomhof, Torre Florim and Arriën Molema) established BAM!, the Dutch Songwriters Society, for which he became the first chairman, from 2015 until 2020.

Discography 
Also check out Discography Pete Philly & Perquisite.

Albums 
 "Horizon" (2019), by Jeangu Macrooy (produced/co-written by Perquisite)
 "Niemand In De Stad: Original Motion Picture Score" (2018)
 "High On You" (2017), by Jeangu Macrooy (produced/co-written by Perquisite)
 "Collected Works" (2015), as Perquisite & Sliderinc
 "Lovestruck Puzzles" (2013), as Kris Berry & Perquisite
 "Across" (2010)
 "Carmen van het Noorden: De Soundtrack" (2009)
 "Mystery Repeats: The Live Edition" (2008), as Pete Philly & Perquisite
 "Mystery Repeats" (2007), as Pete Philly & Perquisite
 "Remindstate" (2007), as Pete Philly & Perquisite
 "Mindstate" (2005), as Pete Philly & Perquisite

EPs 
 "Brave Enough" (2016), by Jeangu Macrooy (produced/arranged by Perquisite)
 "Lotus" (2011), with Renske Taminiau, soundtrack Lotus (film)
 "Expressions" (2003), as North West Metropolis  
 "Double Vision" (2002), with David Kweksilber
 "Outta Nowhere" (2001), with Benjamin Herman

Singles 
 "Birth Of A New Age" (2021), by Jeangu Macrooy (produced by Perquisite)
 "Grow" (2020), by Jeangu Macrooy (produced by Perquisite)
 "Second Hand Lover" (2019), by Jeangu Macrooy (produced by Perquisite)
 "Shake Up This Place" (2019), by Jeangu Macrooy (produced/co-written by Perquisite)
 "Dance With Me" (2018), by Jeangu Macrooy (produced/co-written by Perquisite)
 "How Much I Love You" (2018), by Jeangu Macrooy (produced/co-written by Perquisite)
 "Tell Me Father" (2017), by Jeangu Macrooy (produced/co-written by Perquisite)
 "High On You" (2017), by Jeangu Macrooy (produced/co-written by Perquisite)
 "Crazy Kids" (2017), by Jeangu Macrooy (produced/co-written by Perquisite)
 "Step Into The Water" (2017), by Jeangu Macrooy (produced/co-written by Perquisite)
 "Brave Enough" (2016), by Jeangu Macrooy (produced/co-written by Perquisite)
 "To Love Is To Hurt" (2016), by Jeangu Macrooy (produced/co-written by Perquisite)
 "Gold" (2016), by Jeangu Macrooy (produced/co-written by Perquisite)
 "Birds On Branches" (2014), as Kris Berry & Perquisite
 "Warm" (2014), as Kris Berry & Perquisite
 "Let Go" (2013), as Kris Berry & Perquisite
 "Hitchhike" (2013), as Kris Berry & Perquisite
 "Blackbirds" (2011), feat. GMB
 "Dreams Of Gold" (2010), feat. Jenny Lane
 "Set Me Free" (2010), feat. Urita & Sanguita
 "Q&A" (2008), as Pete Philly & Perquisite
 "Mystery Repeats" (2008), as Pete Philly & Perquisite
 "Empire" (2008), as Pete Philly & Perquisite
 "Time Flies" (2007), as Pete Philly & Perquisite
 "Mellow" (2006), as Pete Philly & Perquisite
 "Grateful/Amazed" (2005), as Pete Philly & Perquisite
 "Hope/Cocksure" (2005), as Pete Philly & Perquisite
 "Insomnia" (2005), as Pete Philly & Perquisite

Production 
 Production, recording, arrangements and mix "Horizon" - Jeangu Macrooy (Unexpected Records, 2019)
 Production, recording, arrangements and mix "High On You" - Jeangu Macrooy (Unexpected Records, 2017)
 Production, recording, arrangements, mix and instrumentation "Brave Enough EP" - Jeangu Macrooy (Unexpected Records, 2016)
 Production "Street of Hearts" - Niels Geusebroek (Cats Don't Swim, 2014) 
 Production "Nieuwe Belofte" - De Gebroeders Fretz (Universal Music, 2012) 
 String arrangements and cello "Motorbike" & "Unbearable Lightness Of Love" - Dazzled Kid (Fire Needs Air, Universal Music, 2011) 
 String arrangements and cello "Indian Hay" & "Sunday Blossom" - Benjamin Herman (Blue Sky Blond, Roach Records / Dox Records, 2009) 
 Production "Lyrical Love" - Renske Taminiau (Waiting To Be Told, Unconventional Records / Challenge Records, 2008)
 Production/composition "Second Blow" - Voicst (A Tale Of Two Devils, Good Busy/PIAS, 2008) 
 Cello on "Mindstate" - New Generation Big Band (Had Je Wat? 2007)
 Production/composition "Nothing To Play With" - Perquisite (Project Mooncircle, Luna Orbit, 2005)
 String arrangements "Schouderklopje" - Terilekst (online, 2005)
 Production/composition "Nebula" - The Proov (Nebula, Unexpected Records, 2003) 
 Co-production/composition "Indy & Wich, MOD, Shogun & The Proov – Flockwork" (From Amsterdam to Praha, Redrum, 2003)

Filmography

Film music 
 "Buiten Is Het Feest" (Jelle Nesna, 2020)
 "Huisvrouwen Bestaan Niet 2" (Anniëlle Webster, 2019), with Sliderinc
 "Niemand In De Stad" (Michiel van Erp, 2018)
 "Huisvrouwen Bestaan Niet" (Anniëlle Webster, 2017), with Sliderinc
 "Hartenstrijd" (Janice Pierre, 2016), with Sliderinc
 "Brasserie Valentijn" (Sanne Vogel, 2016), with Sliderinc
 "Wiplala" (Tim Oliehoek, 2014), only the songs (with Ruben Hein and Alain Clark)
 "Hartenstraat" (Sanne Vogel, 2014), with Sliderinc
 "Kort" (Sanne Vogel, 2013)
 "Cabo" (Ivan Barbosa, 2012)
 "De Rekening van Catelijne" (Sarah Sylbing & Ester Gould, 2012)
 "Lotus" (Pascale Simons, 2011), with Sliderinc
 "Klein" (Sanne Vogel, 2011)
 "Lellebelle" (Mischa Kamp, 2009)
 "Carmen van het Noorden" (Jelle Nesna, 2009)

TV productions 
 "Van God Los": episode 'Dead Man's Hand' (Steffen Haars, 2013), with Sliderinc
 "Het Snelle Geld" (Ijsbrand van Veelen, 2012)
 "Erop of Eronder" (Michiel van Erp, 2011)
 "Mama" (Sanne Vogel, 2010)

References

1982 births
Living people
Dutch music people
Musicians from Amsterdam